Kunjathur  is a census town in Kasaragod district in the state of Kerala, India.

Demographics
As of 2011 Census, Kunjathur had a population of 13,633 where 6,729 are males and 6,904 are females. In Kunjathur, 12.3% of the population was under 6 years of age. Kunjathur had an average literacy of 90.2% lower than state average of 94%: male literacy was 94.9% and female literacy was 85.7%.

Religions
As of 2011 census, Kunjathur town had 13,633 population, which comprises 6,824 Muslims (50.1%), 5,924 Hindus (43.5%), 852 Christians (6.2%) and Others (0.2%).

Transportation
Local roads have access to National Highway No.66 which connects to Mangalore in the north and Calicut in the south.  The nearest railway station is Manjeshwar on Shoranur-Mangalore section under southern railway zone. The nearest airport is at Mangalore.

Languages
This locality is an essentially multi-lingual region. The people speak Malayalam, Tulu, Beary bashe, Kannada and Konkani. Migrant workers also speak Hindi and Tamil languages.

Administration
This village is part of Manjeswaram assembly constituency which is again part of Kasaragod (Lok Sabha constituency)

References

Manjeshwar area
Cities and towns in Kasaragod district